Tom Stuart (November 19, 1936 – November 16, 2001), was a pioneer in the development of the two-party system in the U.S. state of Mississippi. On June 5, 1973, he was elected as the first Republican mayor of Meridian, the county seat of Lauderdale County in eastern Mississippi.

Background
Born James Thomas Stuart, Jr, in Pensacola, Florida.  He is the son of James Thomas and  Joyce A. (Brown) Stuart. He attended Meridian High School where he was a member of the French club, the chess club, and played on the basketball team for a year.

References

1936 births
2001 deaths
Mississippi Republicans
Politicians from Jackson, Mississippi
Meridian Junior College alumni
Florida Institute of Technology alumni
Mayors of Meridian, Mississippi
20th-century American politicians